Shay Shelnutt (born September 21, 1967) is an American politician and current member of the Alabama State Senate, representing the 17th District.

Alabama Senate

2014 election 
On February 3, 2014, Shelnutt announced that he would be running for the District 17 seat in the Alabama State Senate, which would be vacated by Scott Beason.

Shelnutt would go on to win the run-off election for the Republican primary on July 16.

In May 2019, he voted to make abortion a crime at any stage in a pregnancy, with no exemptions for cases of rape or incest.

Committee assignments 
 Banking and Insurance
 Confirmations
 Education & Youth Affairs
 Governmental Affairs
 Local Legislation Jefferson County

Personal

Shelnutt competed on an episode of Family Feud that originally aired October 12, 2015.

References

External links

1967 births
Living people
Republican Party Alabama state senators
Politicians from Birmingham, Alabama
21st-century American politicians